1844 Susilva, provisional designation , is a stony Eoan asteroid from the outer region of the asteroid belt, approximately 22 kilometers in diameter. It was discovered on 30 October 1972, by Swiss astronomer Paul Wild at Zimmerwald Observatory near Bern, Switzerland, and later named after a schoolfriend of the discoverer.

Classification and orbit 

Susilva is a member of the Eos family, a collisional group of more than 4,000 asteroids, which are well known for mostly being of silicaceous composition. It orbits the Sun in the outer main-belt at a distance of 2.9–3.2 AU once every 5 years and 3 months (1,912 days). Its orbit has an eccentricity of 0.05 and an inclination of 12° with respect to the ecliptic.

Physical characteristics 

According to the survey carried out by NASA's Wide-field Infrared Survey Explorer with its subsequent NEOWISE mission, the asteroid measures between 19.0 and 26.8 kilometers in diameter, and its surface has an albedo of 0.118 to 0.236. The Collaborative Asteroid Lightcurve Link assumes an albedo of 0.14, taken from 221 Eos, the family's largest member and namesake – and calculates a diameter of 22.4 kilometers based on an absolute magnitude of 11.0. Susilvas rotation period has not yet been measured.

Naming 

The discoverer named a pair of asteroids after two of his former schoolmates, Susi and Helen, both from the small village of Wald, Zürich in Switzerland. This one was dedicated to Susi Petit–Pierre, while the subsequently numbered asteroid, 1845 Helewalda, was given to Helen Gachnang. The official  was published by the Minor Planet Center on 18 April 1977.

References

External links 
 Asteroid Lightcurve Database (LCDB), query form (info )
 Dictionary of Minor Planet Names, Google books
 Asteroids and comets rotation curves, CdR – Observatoire de Genève, Raoul Behrend
 Discovery Circumstances: Numbered Minor Planets (1)-(5000) – Minor Planet Center
 
 

001844
Discoveries by Paul Wild (Swiss astronomer)
Named minor planets
19721030